Tamasgo, Zorgho is a village in the Zorgho Department of Ganzourgou Province in central Burkina Faso. The village has a population of 931.

References

External links
Satellite map at Maplandia.com

Populated places in the Plateau-Central Region
Ganzourgou Province